Killik is a village in the Şahinbey District, Gaziantep Province, Turkey. The village had a population of 140 in 2022. The village is inhabited by Turkmens. The inhabitants are Alevis and belong to the Hacım Sultan and Baba Kaygusuz ocaks.

References

Villages in Şahinbey District